Levanger Station is a railway station located in the centre of the town of Levanger in the municipality of Levanger in Trøndelag county, Norway.  The station is located along the Nordland Line. The station serves both local and express trains northbound through Innherred and to Nordland, and southbound to Trondheim. The Trøndelag Commuter Rail, which runs between Steinkjer and Trondheim, stops at Levanger, and operates at a one-hour intervals.

History
The station was opened on 29 October 1902 on the Hell–Sunnan Line as the section to Levanger was finished. There was at the time of construction a controversy as to whether the station should be in the western or eastern part of town. Operation of the restaurant was run by Norsk Spisevognselskap between 1 October 1934 and 8 May 1945.

Media gallery

References

Railway stations in Levanger
Railway stations on the Nordland Line
Railway stations opened in 1902
1902 establishments in Norway
National Romantic architecture in Norway
Art Nouveau railway stations